"Something Real" is a song written and performed by American singers Summer Walker & Chris Brown with sole production from American record producer London on da Track.

Composition 
"Something Real" is an R&B song where Walker expresses her desire to find the right man for her, explaining her needs to the person concerned and how her previous boyfriend did not please her, and Brown plays the part of the person concerned, explaining that he knows what she is about.

Track listing
 Digital download and stream
 "Something Real" – 3:34

Charts

References

2019 singles
2019 songs
Chris Brown songs
London on da Track songs
Songs written by Chris Brown

Song recordings produced by London on da Track